Stenolemus lanipes is a species of thread-legged bug (Emesinae).

This species feeds on spiders, especially spiderlings of Parasteatoda tepidariorum. Stenolemus lanipes will not feed upon other insects (such as Drosophila) placed upon a web, even to the point of starvation.

References

Reduviidae
Hemiptera of Asia
Hemiptera of Europe
Insects described in 1949